Felipe González de Ahedo, also spelled Phelipe González y Haedo (13 May 1714 in Santoña, Cantabria – 26 October 1802), was a Spanish navigator and cartographer known for annexing Easter Island in 1770.

González de Ahedo commanded two Spanish ships, the San Lorenzo and the Santa Rosalia, sent by the Viceroy of Peru, Manuel de Amat y Juniet. They landed on 15 November 1770, only the second time European had seen Easter Island, and stayed five days, thoroughly surveyed the coast, and named it Isla de San Carlos, taking possession on behalf of King Charles III of Spain. They ceremoniously signed a treaty of annexation with the inhabitants and erected three wooden crosses on top of three small hills on Poike volcano.

They were amazed by the "standing idols", moai, all of which they could see were erect.

Early life 
Felipe González de Ahedo was born in Santona, Spain, circa 1700. Felipe's parents were referred to as respectable people but were not particularly wealthy at the time of their son's birth. Although his parents did not have much money, they supported him and his dreams of becoming a seaman. Because Felipe grew up in a small town right next to the sea, he developed a bond with the ocean at an early age. This bond eventually led him to choose his profession as a seafarer.

Beginnings of a Career 
At the age of 25, Felipe González de Ahedo set out to solidify his career. He entered the Royal Armada of Spain and served on the ship San Bernardo as an apprentice. Just two years later, he was appointed to the Santiago. This is where he gained his reputation as a talented sailor and was noticed by his superiors.

Adventures 
It was 1730 when he joined the ship Aranzasu. On this boat, he traveled to the West Indies and back. This was his first real adventure in the New World. By 1736, Felipe had joined a new ship once again. This boat was the Incendio and he was aboard it when it made its voyage to Veracruz. This was his first experience in Central America. After a few more years of service, Felipe was finally promoted to the rank of junior lieutenant in 1751.

In 1760, Felipe was given command of the frigate Arrogant. His job while commanding the frigate was to help protect eighteen ships sheltering in the Bay of Ferrol from enemy ships. After his experience on the frigate, Felipe went on to serve on numerous ships of all shapes and sizes until 1766 came around. In 1766, he was promoted to Commander of the Firme. He used the Firme to hunt down “piratical xebeques of Algiers.” Xebeques (also known as xebecs) are Mediterranean sailing ships mostly used for trading. While Felipe did end up sighting many of these piratical xebeques, he was never able to capture one because his ship was not fast enough.

The Annexation of Easter Island 
The year was 1769 when Felipe was appointed to the command of the San Lorenzo. The San Lorenzo was an impressive ship with enough holes on its sides for 64 guns. Ahedo navigated this boat to “El Callao de Lima” carrying with him troops and military stores. His voyage took over 6 months to complete and by the time he arrived, it was already 1770. After arriving in El Callao de Lima, the Viceroy (a ruler exercising authority in a colony on behalf of a sovereign) instructed Felipe to take possession of Easter Island because Spain wanted it for itself. After returning from Easter Island, having annexed it, he was promoted once again to a Post Captain by the officials in El Callao de Lima.

Final Years 
By 1772, Felipe had returned to Spain and exchanged his treasures for pesos. By doing this, he was able to obtain 119,521 pesos and finally bring some money to his family's name. In 1774 Felipe made the trip to El Callao de Lima once again and in 1778, he was appointed to the ship San Isidoro by the king himself. By the time 1782 came around, Felipe had been promoted to a Commodore and served on the ship San Eugenio. This was the last ship he would ever serve on. After his time with the San Eugenio, he retired from active service on the water but continued working in the Navy Office until his death. Felipe González de Ahedo died in 1792. He was around 92 years old and had served around 75 of those years on the sea.

Notes

References

1714 births
1802 deaths
People from Santoña
Scientists from Cantabria
Military personnel from Cantabria
Spanish cartographers
Spanish navigators
History of Easter Island
Easter Island people
18th-century cartographers
Spanish explorers of the Pacific
1770 in Easter Island